Yelena Carolina Maciel Vera (born 29 October 1988 in Merida, Venezuela) is a Venezuelan actress. She became known in 2002 on the Radio Caracas Televisión's telenovela, Trapos íntimos. In 2015 she obtained his first leading role in the RCTV Producciones telenovela, Corazón traicionado, a production that premiered 3 years later in Venezuela for Televen.

Maciel, with fellow  Venezuelan Carlos Felipe Álvarez, starred within the music video for Daddy Yankee's "La Rompe Corazones", directed by Venezuelan director Nuno Gómes.  The clip was scheduled to premier on Daddy Yankee's YouTube account on June 2, 2017 but had to be re-edited on June 1, 2017 due to the platform's change on its content regulations. The visual finally premiered on June 7, 2017.

Filmography

Personal life 
Maciel married the Venezuelan actor Jonathan Montenegro in 2011  with the couple having their only child daughter in 2012.  They divorced in 2014.

References

External links 
 
www.youtube.com Daddy Yankee ft Ozuna - La Rompe Corazones (Official Video)

1988 births
Living people
Venezuelan telenovela actresses
21st-century Venezuelan actresses
People from Mérida (state)
Venezuelan television actresses